The 1958–59 Kansas State Wildcats men's basketball team represented Kansas State University as a member of the Big 8 Conference during the 1958–59 NCAA University Division men's basketball season. The head coach was Tex Winter, innovator of the Triangle offense and future member of the Basketball Hall of Fame, who was in his sixth year at the helm.  The Wildcats finished with a record of 25–2 (14–0 Big 8), the No. 1 ranking in both major polls, but fell short of a second straight Final Four appearance after a loss to Cincinnati in the Midwest Regional final of the NCAA tournament.

The team played its home games at Ahearn Field House in Manhattan, Kansas.

Roster

Schedule and results

|-
!colspan=6 style=| Non-Conference Regular season

|-
!colspan=6 style=| Big Eight Regular season

|-
!colspan=6 style=| NCAA Tournament

Rankings

Awards and honors
 Bob Boozer – Consensus First-team All-American (2x), Big Eight Player of the Year (2x)
 Tex Winter – Big Eight Coach of the Year

Team players drafted into the NBA

References

Kansas State
Kansas State
Kansas State Wildcats men's basketball seasons
1958 in sports in Kansas
1959 in sports in Kansas